Michał Olszewski may refer to:

 Michał Olszewski (chess player), (born 1989), Polish chess player
 Michał Olszewski (priest), ( 1712 –  1779), Roman Catholic priest